Corry Island is an island  long and  high, lying off the south coast of the Trinity Peninsula between Vega Island and Eagle Island. This is believed to be the feature sighted by a British expedition under James Clark Ross, 1839–43, and named Cape Corry for Thomas L. Corry, a Lord Commissioner of the Admiralty. In 1945, the Falkland Islands Dependencies Survey (FIDS) charted an archipelago in this area. The present application of this name is in accord with the FIDS "that the name of Corry should be perpetuated on the most conspicuous of these islands as seen from eastward (the direction from which it was seen by Ross)."

See also 
 List of Antarctic and sub-Antarctic islands

References 

Islands of Trinity Peninsula